Scott Peters is a Canadian  television producer, television director and screenwriter, most probably known for his involvement in writing, co-creating and producing for the science fiction television series The 4400. He is also the head writer of the 2009 sci-fi series V, a remake of the 1980s sci-fi miniseries originally created by Kenneth Johnson. Peters is also credited as Executive Producer for the series.

Filmography 
 4400 (1 episode) (2022)
 Batwoman, director (1 episode) (2019)
 Marvel's Runaways, director (1 episode) (2018)
 The Gifted, director (3 episodes) and writer (2017–2019)
 V, developed by and head writer (2009–2011)
 The 4400, creator, writer and director (2004–2007)
 The Outer Limits, writer (1999–2000)

References

External links 
 

Canadian male screenwriters
Canadian television directors
Canadian television producers
Living people
Year of birth missing (living people)
20th-century Canadian male writers
21st-century Canadian male writers
20th-century Canadian screenwriters
21st-century Canadian screenwriters